Cyberspace is a concept describing a widespread interconnected digital technology. "The expression dates back from the first decade of the diffusion of the internet. It refers to the online world as a world 'apart', as distinct from everyday reality. In cyberspace people can hide behind fake identities, as in the famous The New Yorker cartoon." (Delfanti, Arvidsson, 150) The term entered popular culture from science fiction and the arts but is now used by technology strategists, security professionals, governments, military and industry leaders and entrepreneurs to describe the domain of the global technology environment, commonly defined as standing for the global network of interdependent information technology infrastructures, telecommunications networks and computer processing systems. Others consider cyberspace to be just a notional environment in which communication over computer networks occurs. The word became popular in the 1990s when the use of the Internet, networking, and digital communication were all growing dramatically; the term cyberspace was able to represent the many new ideas and phenomena that were emerging.

As a social experience, individuals can interact, exchange ideas, share information, provide social support, conduct business, direct actions, create artistic media, play games, engage in political discussion, and so on, using this global network. They are sometimes referred to as cybernauts. The term cyberspace has become a conventional means to describe anything associated with the Internet and the diverse Internet culture. The United States government recognizes the interconnected information technology and the interdependent network of information technology infrastructures operating across this medium as part of the US national critical infrastructure. Amongst individuals on cyberspace, there is believed to be a code of shared rules and ethics mutually beneficial for all to follow, referred to as cyberethics. Many view the right to privacy as most important to a functional code of cyberethics.  Such moral responsibilities go hand in hand when working online with global networks, specifically, when opinions are involved with online social experiences.

According to Chip Morningstar and F. Randall Farmer, cyberspace is defined more by the social interactions involved rather than its technical implementation. In their view, the computational medium in cyberspace is an augmentation of the communication channel between real people; the core characteristic of cyberspace is that it offers an environment that consists of many participants with the ability to affect and influence each other. They derive this concept from the observation that people seek richness, complexity, and depth within a virtual world.

Origins of the term

The term "cyberspace" first appeared in the visual arts in the late 1960s, when Danish artist Susanne Ussing (1940-1998) and her partner architect Carsten Hoff (b. 1934) constituted themselves as Atelier Cyberspace. Under this name the two made a series of installations and images entitled "sensory spaces" that were based on the principle of open systems adaptable to various influences, such as human movement and the behaviour of new materials.

Atelier Cyberspace worked at a time when the Internet did not exist and computers were more or less off-limit to artists and creative engagement. In a 2015-interview with Scandinavian art magazine Kunstkritikk, Carsten Hoff recollects, that although Atelier Cyberspace did try to implement computers, they had no interest in the virtual space as such:

And in the same interview Hoff continues:

The works of Atelier Cyberspace were originally shown at a number of Copenhagen venues and have later been exhibited at The National Gallery of Denmark in Copenhagen as part of the exhibition "What's Happening?"

The term "cyberspace" first appeared in fiction in the 1980s in the work of cyberpunk science fiction author William Gibson, first in his 1982 short story "Burning Chrome" and later in his 1984 novel Neuromancer. In the next few years, the word became prominently identified with online computer networks. The portion of Neuromancer cited in this respect is usually the following:

Now widely used, the term has since been criticized by Gibson, who commented on the origin of the term in the 2000 documentary No Maps for These Territories:

Metaphorical
Don Slater uses a metaphor to define cyberspace, describing the "sense of a social setting that exists purely within a space of representation and communication ... it exists entirely within a computer space, distributed across increasingly complex and fluid networks." The term "Cyberspace" started to become a de facto synonym for the Internet, and later the World Wide Web, during the 1990s, especially in academic circles and activist communities. Author Bruce Sterling, who popularized this meaning, credits John Perry Barlow as the first to use it to refer to "the present-day nexus of computer and telecommunications networks". Barlow describes it thus in his essay to announce the formation of the Electronic Frontier Foundation (note the spatial metaphor) in June 1990:

As Barlow, and the EFF continued public education efforts to promote the idea of "digital rights", the term was increasingly used during the Internet boom of the late 1990s.

Virtual environments
Although the present-day, loose use of the term "cyberspace" no longer implies or suggests immersion in a virtual reality, current technology allows the integration of a number of capabilities (sensors, signals, connections, transmissions, processors, and controllers) sufficient to generate a virtual interactive experience that is accessible regardless of a geographic location.  It is for these reasons cyberspace has been described as the ultimate tax haven.

In 1989, Autodesk, an American multinational corporation that focuses on 2D and 3D design software, developed a virtual design system called Cyberspace.

Recent definitions of Cyberspace

Although several definitions of cyberspace can be found both in scientific literature and in official governmental sources, there is no fully agreed official definition yet. According to F. D. Kramer there are 28 different definitions of the term cyberspace.  See in particular the following links: "Cyberpower and National Security: Policy Recommendations for a Strategic Framework,"  in Cyberpower and National Security, FD Kramer, S. Starr, L.K. Wentz (ed.), National Defense University Press, Washington (DC) 2009; see also Mayer, M., Chiarugi, I., De Scalzi, N., https://www.academia.edu/14336129/International_Politics_in_the_Digital_Age.

The most recent draft definition is the following:

The Joint Chiefs of Staff of the United States Department of Defense define cyberspace as one of five interdependent domains, the remaining four being land, air, maritime, and space. See United States Cyber Command

Cyberspace as an Internet metaphor

While cyberspace should not be confused with the Internet, the term is often used to refer to objects and identities that exist largely within the communication network itself, so that a website, for example, might be metaphorically said to "exist in cyberspace". According to this interpretation, events taking place on the Internet are not happening in the locations where participants or servers are physically located, but "in cyberspace". The philosopher Michel Foucault used the term heterotopias, to describe such spaces which are simultaneously physical and mental.

Firstly, cyberspace describes the flow of digital data through the network of interconnected computers: it is at once not "real", since one could not spatially locate it as a tangible object, and clearly "real" in its effects. There have been several attempts to create a concise model about how cyberspace works since it is not a physical thing that can be looked at. Secondly, cyberspace is the site of computer-mediated communication (CMC), in which online relationships and alternative forms of online identity were enacted, raising important questions about the social psychology of Internet use, the relationship between "online" and "offline" forms of life and interaction, and the relationship between the "real" and the virtual. Cyberspace draws attention to remediation of culture through new media technologies: it is not just a communication tool but a social destination and is culturally significant in its own right. Finally, cyberspace can be seen as providing new opportunities to reshape society and culture through "hidden" identities, or it can be seen as borderless communication and culture.

The "space" in cyberspace has more in common with the abstract, mathematical meanings of the term (see space) than physical space. It does not have the duality of positive and negative volume (while in physical space, for example, a room has the negative volume of usable space delineated by positive volume of walls, Internet users cannot enter the screen and explore the unknown part of the Internet as an extension of the space they are in), but spatial meaning can be attributed to the relationship between different pages (of books as well as web servers), considering the unturned pages to be somewhere "out there." The concept of cyberspace, therefore, refers not to the content being presented to the surfer, but rather to the possibility of surfing among different sites, with feedback loops between the user and the rest of the system creating the potential to always encounter something unknown or unexpected.

Video games differ from text-based communication in that on-screen images are meant to be figures that actually occupy a space and the animation shows the movement of those figures. Images are supposed to form the positive volume that delineates the empty space. A game adopts the cyberspace metaphor by engaging more players in the game, and then figuratively representing them on the screen as avatars. Games do not have to stop at the avatar-player level, but current implementations aiming for more immersive playing space (i.e. Laser tag) take the form of augmented reality rather than cyberspace, fully immersive virtual realities remaining impractical.

Although the more radical consequences of the global communication network predicted by some cyberspace proponents (i.e. the diminishing of state influence envisioned by John Perry Barlow) failed to materialize and the word lost some of its novelty appeal, it remains current .

Some virtual communities explicitly refer to the concept of cyberspace, for example Linden Lab calling their customers "Residents" of Second Life, while all such communities can be positioned "in cyberspace" for explanatory and comparative purposes (as did Sterling in The Hacker Crackdown, followed by many journalists), integrating the metaphor into a wider cyber-culture.

The metaphor has been useful in helping a new generation of thought leaders to reason through new military strategies around the world, led largely by the US Department of Defense (DoD). The use of cyberspace as a metaphor has had its limits, however, especially in areas where the metaphor becomes confused with physical infrastructure. It has also been critiqued as being unhelpful for falsely employing a spatial metaphor to describe what is inherently a network.

Alternate realities in philosophy and art

Predating computers
A forerunner of the modern ideas of cyberspace is the Cartesian notion that people might be deceived by an evil demon that feeds them a false reality. This argument is the direct predecessor of modern ideas of a brain in a vat and many popular conceptions of cyberspace take Descartes's ideas as their starting point.

Visual arts have a tradition, stretching back to antiquity, of artifacts meant to fool the eye and be mistaken for reality. This questioning of reality occasionally led some philosophers and especially theologians to distrust art as deceiving people into entering a world which was not real (see Aniconism). The artistic challenge was resurrected with increasing ambition as art became more and more realistic with the invention of photography, film (see Arrival of a Train at La Ciotat), and immersive computer simulations.

Influenced by computers

Philosophy
American counterculture exponents like William S. Burroughs (whose literary influence on Gibson and cyberpunk in general is widely acknowledged) and Timothy Leary were among the first to extol the potential of computers and computer networks for individual empowerment.

Some contemporary philosophers and scientists (e.g. David Deutsch in The Fabric of Reality) employ virtual reality in various thought experiments. For example, Philip Zhai in Get Real: A Philosophical Adventure in Virtual Reality connects cyberspace to the Platonic tradition:

Note that this brain-in-a-vat argument conflates cyberspace with reality, while the more common descriptions of cyberspace contrast it with the "real world".

Cyber-Geography
The “Geography of Notopia” (Papadimitriou, 2006) theorizes about the complex interplay of cyber-cultures and the geographical space. This interplay has several philosophical and psychological facets (Papadimitriou, 2009).

A New Communication Model

The technological convergence of the mass media is the result of a long adaptation process of their communicative resources to the evolutionary changes of each historical moment. Thus, the new media became (plurally) an extension of the traditional media in cyberspace, allowing to the public access information in a wide range of digital devices. In other words, it is a cultural virtualization of human reality as a result of the migration from physical to virtual space (mediated by the ICTs), ruled by codes, signs and particular social relationships. Forwards, arise instant ways of communication, interaction and possible quick access to information, in which we are no longer mere senders, but also producers, reproducers, co-workers and providers. New technologies also help to "connect" people from different cultures outside the virtual space, which was unthinkable fifty years ago. In this giant relationships web, we mutually absorb each other's beliefs, customs, values, laws and habits, cultural legacies perpetuated by a physical-virtual dynamics in constant metamorphosis (ibidem). In this sense, Professor Doctor Marcelo Mendonça Teixeira created, in 2013, a new model of communication to the virtual universe, based in Claude Elwood Shannon (1948) article "A Mathematical Theory of Communication".

Art

Having originated among writers, the concept of cyberspace remains most popular in literature and film. Although artists working with other media have expressed interest in the concept, such as Roy Ascott, "cyberspace" in digital art is mostly used as a synonym for immersive virtual reality and remains more discussed than enacted.

Computer crime

Cyberspace also brings together every service and facility imaginable to expedite money laundering. One can purchase anonymous credit cards, bank accounts, encrypted global mobile telephones, and false passports. From there one can pay professional advisors to set up IBCs (International Business Corporations, or corporations with anonymous ownership) or similar structures in OFCs (Offshore Financial Centers). Such advisors are loath to ask any penetrating questions about the wealth and activities of their clients, since the average fees criminals pay them to launder their money can be as much as 20 percent.

5-level model
In 2010, a five-level model was designed in France. According to this model, cyberspace is composed of five layers based on information discoveries: 1) language, 2) writing, 3) printing, 4) Internet, 5) Etc., i.e. the rest, e.g. noosphere, artificial life, artificial intelligence, etc., etc. This original model links the world of information to telecommunication technologies.

See also

Augmented browsing
Artificial intelligence
Autonomy
Computer security
Cyber-HUMINT
Cyberwarfare
Cyber security standards
Framework Programmes for Research and Technological Development
Wired glove
Online magazine
Cybersex
Crypto-anarchism
Digital pet
Esports
Global commons
Information superhighway
Infosphere
Internet art
Legal aspects of computing
Wikipedia:Link surfing
Real life
Metaverse
Mixed reality
Multi-agent system
Noosphere
Simulated reality
Social software
Computer program
Sentience
Telepresence
Virtual world
Virtual reality
World Wide Web

Further reading

 Branch, J. (2020). "What's in a Name? Metaphors and Cybersecurity." International Organization.

References

Sources

Cyberculture, The key Concepts, edited by David Bell, Brian D.Loader, Nicholas Pleace and Douglas Schuler
Christine Buci-Glucksmann, "L’art à l’époque virtuel", in Frontières esthétiques de l’art, Arts 8, Paris: L’Harmattan, 2004
William Gibson. Neuromancer:20th Anniversary Edition. New York:Ace Books, 2004.
Oliver Grau: Virtual Art. From Illusion to Immersion, MIT-Press, Cambridge 2003. (4 Auflagen).
David Koepsell, The Ontology of Cyberspace, Chicago: Open Court, 2000.
 
Irvine, Martin. "Postmodern Science Fiction and Cyberpunk", retrieved 2006-07-19.
Slater, Don 2002, 'Social Relationships and Identity Online and Offline', in L.Lievrouw and S.Livingston (eds), The Handbook of New Media, Sage, London, pp533–46.

Sterling, Bruce. The Hacker Crackdown: Law and Disorder On the Electronic Frontier. Spectra Books, 1992.
Zhai, Philip. Get Real: A Philosophical Adventure in Virtual Reality. New York: Rowman & Littlefield Publishers, 1998.
Teixeira, Marcelo Mendonça (2012). Cyberculture: From Plato To The Virtual Universe. The Architecture of Collective Intelligence. Munich: Grin Verlag.

External links

 A Declaration of the Independence of Cyberspace by John Perry Barlow
 A Critique of the word "Cyberspace" at ZeroGeography
 Virtual Reality Photos, Austria by Johann Steininger
 Peculiarities of Cyberspace by Albert Benschop
 Sex, Religion and Cyberspace by Richard Thieme
  Get Real: A Philosophical Adventure in Virtual Reality by Philip Zhai
 Brains in a vat philosophical argument against the idea that we could be in cyberspace and not know it by Hilary Putnam
 Cyberspace as a Domain In which the Air Force Flies and Fights, Speech by Secretary of the Air Force Michael Wynne
 DOD - Cyberspace
 DHS - National Cybersecurity Division

 
Cyberpunk themes
History of the Internet
Information Age
Virtual reality
William Gibson
1980s neologisms

 what is cyberspace
 what is cyberspace